Rudik Petrosyan (born October 18, 1980 in Leninakan, Armenian SSR) is an Armenian retired weightlifter. He competed at the 2000 Summer Olympics in the men's 69 kg division.

References

External links
Sports-Reference.com

1980 births
Living people
Sportspeople from Gyumri
Armenian male weightlifters
Olympic weightlifters of Armenia
Weightlifters at the 2000 Summer Olympics